Phoenix Clark Sanders (born June 5, 1995) is an American professional baseball pitcher in the Baltimore Orioles organization. He made his MLB debut in 2022 for the Tampa Bay Rays.

Early life and amateur career
Sanders was born in Augsburg, Bavaria, Germany and grew up in Orlando, Florida. He attended Buchholz High School when his family moved to Gainesville, Florida in 2009. He was a member of the varsity baseball team in his final two years and won seven games with a 0.55 ERA as a senior.

Sanders began his college baseball career at Daytona State College after receiving no NCAA Division I scholarship offers out of high school. He played collegiate summer baseball for the Willmar Stingers of the Northwoods League after his freshman season and had a 1-0 record over three starts with a 1.89 ERA and 14 strikeouts. As a sophomore, Sanders made 16 appearances with 14 starts and went 6-6 with a 2.50 ERA and 71 strikeouts. After the season, he transferred to South Florida for his remaining collegiate eligibility. As a senior, Sanders was named second team All-American Athletic Conference after going 6-2 with a 2.78 ERA and 109 strikeouts over 16 starts.

Professional career

Tampa Bay Rays
Sanders was selected in the 10th round of the 2017 Major League Baseball draft by the Tampa Bay Rays. After signing with the team, he was assigned to the rookie-level Princeton Rays. Sanders began the 2018 with the Class-A Bowling Green Hot Rods, where he had a 3.02 ERA and struck out 71 batters in  innings over 28 relief appearances before being promoted to the Charlotte Stone Crabs of the Class A-Advanced Florida State League. He was assigned to the Double-A Montgomery Biscuits at the start of the 2019 season and was promoted to the Triple-A Durham Bulls after pitching in 37 games and posting a 3–3 record with a 1.81 ERA and 15 saves. He was invited to Rays' spring training as a non-roster invitee in 2020 but was eventually reassigned to the minor leagues. Sanders did not play in a game in 2020 due to the cancellation of the Minor League Baseball season because of the COVID-19 pandemic. He returned to Durham for the 2021 season and had a 5-2 record with a 3.38 ERA and 80 strikeouts in 64 innings pitched over 50 appearances.

Sanders was promoted to the Rays major league roster on April 14, 2022. He made his MLB debut the same day, giving up one earned run and striking out two batters in three innings pitched in a 3-6 loss to the Oakland Athletics. He was designated for assignment on August 22.

Baltimore Orioles
On August 24, 2022, Sanders was claimed off waivers by the Baltimore Orioles. On September 3, Sanders was designated for assignment and was sent outright to Triple-A.

References

External links

South Florida Bulls bio

1995 births
Living people
Baseball players from Gainesville, Florida
Bowling Green Hot Rods players
Charlotte Stone Crabs players
Daytona State Falcons baseball players
Durham Bulls players
Major League Baseball pitchers
Major League Baseball players from Germany
Montgomery Biscuits players
Peoria Javelinas players
Princeton Rays players
South Florida Bulls baseball players
Tampa Bay Rays players
Sportspeople from Augsburg